Ronivaldo Bernardo Sales (born 24 March 1989) is a Brazilian professional footballer who plays as a forward for Blau-Weiß Linz. Previously, he has played for SC Austria Lustenau, Kapfenberger SV, Arapongas, and lastly Taubate. Besides Brasil, he has played in Austria.

Club career
On 29 October 2014, Ronivaldo scored a hat-trick in Kapfenberger SV's 8–3 win against LASK Linz. He scored another hat-trick against Floridsdorfer AC on 12 September 2017.

Ronivaldo transferred to FK Austria Wien in the summer of 2015.

On 10 July 2020, he signed with Wacker Innsbruck.

Ronivaldo joined Blau-Weiß Linz on 30 May 2022, signing a two-year contract.

Honours
Individual
Austria Lustenau Player of the Season: 2018–19, 2019–20
Austrian Second League top scorer: 2018–19, 2019–20
Austrian Cup top scorer: 2019–20

References

Living people
1989 births
Association football forwards
Brazilian footballers
Austrian Football Bundesliga players
2. Liga (Austria) players
FK Austria Wien players
Kapfenberger SV players
SC Austria Lustenau players
FC Wacker Innsbruck (2002) players
FC Blau-Weiß Linz players
Brazilian expatriate footballers
Expatriate footballers in Austria
Sportspeople from Ceará
Brazilian expatriate sportspeople in Austria